Sangram is a 2005 Bengali thriller film directed by Haranath Chakraborty and produced by Mukul Sarkar. The film features actors Jisshu Sengupta, Prosenjit Chatterjee and Ranjit Mallick in the lead roles. Ashok Bhadra composed the music for the film. The film was a box office hit.

Plot 
The story of the film is set in a village named Shimulpur village. Satyaprakash, a popular schoolmaster in the village teaching in the Shimulpur High School, is an honorable person in the village. An election campaign was held at the school, Raghav Choudhury and Mohan Roy being the two opponent candidates. Out of them, Mohan was an honest man and wanted to win the elections by maintaining peace and order in the society. But, Raghav takes the other trail and starts troubling the local villagers. Satyaprakash can't tolerate this, and so, he protests against this, by advising the villagers to boycott the elections. Raghav tried to shut the mouth of Satyaprakash and put an end to his activities by bribing him, but he failed. Ultimately, seeing no other way, Raghav kills Satyaprakash. Satyaprakash had two children. His elder son was Karna, and his younger son was Somu. Karna knew his father's murderer, but society forced HIM not to do anything to him and leave the village. He got shelter in a Colonel's house and is brought up there. As he grows, he makes the plans to take revenge on Raghav Choudhury. Meanwhile, Raghav Choudhury became a don of the village and started doing many illegal activities along with his brother Rajesh Choudhury and his friends. On the other hand, during these years, Mohan Roy had paid for Somu's studies. Somu, who had gone abroad to complete his higher education, returned to the village. He and Mohan's daughter, Anjali, were in love with each other. Later, when Mohan Roy protested against Raghav, he got him murdered too by Rajesh. In the meantime, Karna returns, and with the active support of the Colonel, he killed Raghav and his whole gang, thereby fulfilling his revenge. The film ends as finally the Colonel and Karna surrender themselves to the police.

Cast 
 Prosenjit Chatterjee as Karna Ghosh
 Jisshu Sengupta as Somu Ghosh
 Ranjit Mallick as Colonel Vikram Sinha
 Deepankar De as Raghav Chowdhury
 Rajesh Sharma as Rajesh Chowdhury, Raghav's brother
 Sabyasachi Chakrabarty as Inspector Biswadeb Rai
 Arun Banerjee as Abani Samanta
 Dulal Lahiri as Mohon Roy
 Kanchan Mullick as Karna's aid
 Pradip Mukherjee as Satyaprakash Ghosh, Karna and Somu's father
 Debesh Roy Chowdhury as Corrupt police inspector
 Aparajita Mohanty as Mitali Ghosh, Karna & Somu's mother
 Arunima Ghosh as Sumedha Chatterjee, Karna's love interest
 Soumili Biswas as Anjali Roy, Somu's love interest

Soundtrack 

Music of Sangram has been composed by Ashok Bhadra.

Track listing

References 

2005 films
Indian films about revenge
Indian vigilante films
2000s masala films
Indian action thriller films
2005 action drama films
Indian action drama films
Bengali-language Indian films
2000s Bengali-language films
2005 action thriller films
2000s vigilante films
Films directed by Haranath Chakraborty